The Ellen M. Smith Three-Decker was a historic triple decker house in Worcester, Massachusetts.  Built in 1908, it was described as one of the best preserved Queen Anne triple deckers in Worcester University Park area when it was listed on the National Register of Historic Places in 1980.  It was also one of the last to be built in the area, part of a group built to house workers in the business growing along the nearby rail corridor.  It was thought to be demolished, but was actually relocated and re-modeled near-by.

See also
National Register of Historic Places listings in southwestern Worcester, Massachusetts
National Register of Historic Places listings in Worcester County, Massachusetts

References

Apartment buildings in Worcester, Massachusetts
Apartment buildings on the National Register of Historic Places in Massachusetts
Queen Anne architecture in Massachusetts
Houses completed in 1908
National Register of Historic Places in Worcester, Massachusetts
Demolished buildings and structures in Massachusetts
1908 establishments in Massachusetts